Shane Michael Spring (born 25 March 1988) is a South African rugby union player, who most recently played for Spanish División de Honor de Rugby side Ordizia. His regular position is loose-forward or winger.

Career

Youth

He was also included in national team training groups at Under–16 and Under–20 level.

Border Bulldogs

He established himself as a regular for the Bulldogs, playing in the majority of the games for them between 2011 and 2013.

Baia Mare

He was released by the Border Bulldogs at the end of 2013 and joined Romanian SuperLiga side Baia Mare. He scored two tries for them during the 2014 Superliga season to help them win the title.

Old Selbornians

He was released by Baia Mare at the start of 2015 and returned to South Africa. He joined Old Selbornians club and was included in their squad to participate in the 2015 SARU Community Cup.

Ordizia

After his spell at Old Selbornians, he returned to Europe for the 2015–2016 season, joining Spanish División de Honor de Rugby side Ordizia. He made six appearances for the team, scoring two tries, but was released after just four months with the Basque side.

References

South African rugby union players
Living people
1988 births
Border Bulldogs players
Sportspeople from Qonce
Rugby union flankers
Rugby union players from the Eastern Cape